This is a list of historical and living Albanians (ethnic Albanians or people of full and partial Albanian ancestry) who are famous or notable, sorted by occupation and alphabetically.

Religious

Priests 
 Dhimitër Frangu (1443 – 1525), friar and scholar of a noble family, treasurer and councilor of Giorgio Castriota, in 1480 wrote the first biography, in Latin, on the life of Skanderbeg, from which all later writers drew.
 Father Marin Barleti (1450 – 1513), Catholic ecclesiastic and writer, author of the life of Scanderbeg.
 Gjon Buzuku (1499 – 1577), bishop Catholic, author of the oldest known document in Albanian: a translation of the Roman Missal, "Meshari" (1555).
 Pjetër Budi (1565 – 1622), Catholic priest and writer, published three books in Albanian and I leave several poems in his native language.
 Papa Luca Matranga (1567 – 1619), priest and scholar, author of the first literary expression arbëresh of the Albanians in diaspora.
 Frang Bardhi (1606 – 1644), Catholic bishop, lexicographer, folklorist and ethnographer, author of the first dictionary of the Albanian language known so far.
 Pjetër Bogdani (1630 – 1689), Catholic bishop and writer, author of the first Albanian work in prose.
 Papa Nikollë Filja (1691 – 1769), priest and writer.
 Mons. Giuseppe Crispi (1781 – 1859), one of the major figures of the Arbëresh community of Sicily of that era, wrote a number of works on the Albanian language.
 Papa Francesco Antonio Santori (1819 – 1894), writer, poet and playwright.
 Nikoll Kaçorri (1862 – 1917), Catholic religious, politician and patriot, deputy prime minister with Ismail Qemali, in the first Albanian government (1912–1913).
 Gjergj Fishta (1871 – 1940), Franciscan friar, poet, politician and translator.
 Mons. Theofan Stilian Noli (1882 – 1965), bishop and intellectual, writer, scholar, diplomat, politician, historian, orator, founder of the Orthodox Church of Albania.
 Papa Marco La Piana (1883 – 1958), priest and scholar, gave his contribute through his studies on Albanian language.
 Anton Harapi (1888 – 1946), Franciscan friar, teacher, writer and politician.
 Zef Valentini (1900 – 1979), Italian Jesuit, albanologist, byzantinist and historian, naturalized Albanian.
 Cyril of Bulgaria (1901 – 1971), the first Patriarch of the Bulgarian Patriarchate, born of an Albanian family.
 Father Zef Pllumi (1924 – 2007), Franciscan priest and writer, author of the memoirs of Christian religious persecution in Albania.
 Mons. Ercole Lupinacci (1933 – 2016), Bishop of Italo-Albanian Catholic Eparchies of Piana degli Albanesi and Lungro.
 Mons. Sotir Ferrara (1937 – 2017), the Bishop of the Eparchy of Piana degli Albanesi, a diocese of the Italo-Albanian Catholic Church in Sicily, Italy.
 Papa Eleuterio Francesco Fortino (1938 – 2010), priest of the Italo-Albanian Catholic Church, Archimandrite in the Eparchy of Lungro in Calabria, served as the Under Secretary of the Pontifical Council for Promoting Christian Unity and albanolog.
 Arch. Rrok Kola Mirdita (1939 – 2015), Catholic archbishop.
 Mons. Angelo Massafra (born 1949), metropolitan archbishop of Scutari-Pult and president of the Albanian Episcopal Conference.
 Mons. Donato Oliverio (born 1956), Bishop of the Eparchy of Lungro.
 Muhammad Nasiruddin al-Albani, Islamic scholar (specialising in the field of Hadith sciences) and Muslim revivalist in the 20th century. He is well known for his anti-extremist leanings all over the Muslim world.

Seminarians 
 Viktor Gjergji

Martyrs 
 Papa Kristo Negovani (1875 – 1905), religious leader and writer for the Albanian cause.
 Father Daniel Dajani (1906 – 1946), Jesuit religious and martyr, of the Catholic Church, killed by the regime during the communist dictatorship in Albania.

Pope 
 Pope Clement XI (1649 – 1721), Pope of the Catholic Church.

Saints and blessed 
 Saint Papa Josif Papamihali (1912 – 1948), priest of Byzantine rite, formed in the Albanian communities of Italy, martyr of the Albanian Greek-Catholic Church, arrested, sentenced to forced labor, and killed during the communist dictatorship in Albania.
 Saint Mother Teresa (1910 – 1997), Roman Catholic religious and missionary.
 Saint Astius (2nd c. AD), bishop of Dyrrhachium, martyr and saint venerated by the Roman Catholic and Eastern Orthodox churches.
 Saint Pelinus (c. 620 – 5 December 662), native of Dyrrhachium and later Bishop of Brindisi in Italy.
 Saint Angelina of Serbia (1440–1520), the Albanian Despotess consort of Serbian Despot Stefan Branković (r. 1458–1459), and a daughter of Albanian nobleman Gjergj Arianiti. She was proclaimed a saint and venerated as such by the Serbian Orthodox Church.
 Saint John Koukouzelis (1300–c.1350) recognized as a saint by the Eastern Orthodox Church.
 Saints Eleutherius and Antia venerated as Christian saints and martyrs in Greece and Albania by both the Catholic Church and the Eastern Orthodox Church.

Literature

Writers

A–G

H–L

M–S

T–Z

Poets

Screenwriters

Journalists

Folklorists

Translators

Academic sciences

Scientists 

{{columns-list|colwidth=30em|
 Teki Biçoku (1926–2009)  geologist; former member and president of the Academy of Sciences of Albania
 Gjon Gazulli (1400–1465) astronomer
 Pandi Geço geographer
 Shtjefën Gjeçovi (1874–1929)  ethnographer
 Sotir Kuneshka physicist
 Rexhep Meidani  physicist
 Laura Mersini-Houghton  Albanian-American cosmologist and theoretical physicist; associate professor at the University of North Carolina at Chapel Hill; proponent of the multiverse hypothesis which holds that our universe is one of many
 Betim Muço seismologist
 Ferid Murad (born 1936)  physician and pharmacologist; co-winner of the 1998 Nobel Prize in Physiology or Medicine
 Shefqet Pllana (1918–1994) ethnographer
 Niko Qafzezi (1914–1998)  agronomist and pedagogue
 Nijazi Ramadani (born 1964)  ethnographer
 Andrea Shundi (born 1934) – agronomist of the 20th and 21st century
 Xhezair Teliti  mathematician
 Visar Belegu -molecular biologist and associate professor at John's Hopkins University

Philosophers 

 Marin Beçikemi (1468–1526)  15th- and 16th-century humanist, orator, and chronist
 Sami Frashëri (1850–1904)
 Gani Bobi (1943–1995)  philosopher and sociologist from Kosovo
 Ibrahim Gashi (born 1963)  Kosovar Albanian academic and philosopher
 Ukshin Hoti (1943–1999)  Kosovo Albanian philosopher and activist
 Zef Jubani (1818–1880)
 Muhamedin Kullashi
 Shkëlzen Maliqi (born 1947)  Kosovo Albanian philosopher, art critic, political analyst and intellectual; was involved in politics in the 1990s
 Arshi Pipa (1920–1997)  Albanian-American philosopher, writer, poet and literary critic
 Petro Zheji (1929–2015)  linguist, translator, philosopher, and author from Gjirokastër; lived and worked in Tiranë, Albania

Social scientists 
 Gëzim Alpion  academic, political analyst, writer, playwright, and civil society activist
 Albert Doja (born 1957)  social anthropologist, member of the National Albanian Academy of Sciences and University Professor of Anthropology at the University of Lille, France.

Historians

Economists 

 Kostandin Boshnjaku (1888–1953)  banker, politician, one of the earliest Albanian communists
 Shkëlqim Cani (born 1956)  Governor of the Bank of Albania, 1997–2004
 Sokrat Dodbiba (1899–1956)  economist and politician who served as Minister of Finance of Albania, 1943–44
 Ardian Fullani (born 1955)
 Ilir Hoti (1957–2016)  economist and banker
 Arben Malaj (born 1961)
 Qirjako Mihali (1929–2009)
 Filip Noga (1867/1868–1917)  politician; Minister of Finance of the country for four months in 1914; also known as Philippe Nogga
 Gramoz Pashko (1955–2006)  economist and politician
 Ferit Vokopola (born 1887)
 Vrioni family  one of the great aristocratic and biggest landowner families of Albania

Publishers

Scholars and linguists

Rulers

 Skanderbeg (1405–1468) 15th-century Albanian lord; "Hero of Christianism"; initiated and organized the League of Lezhë, which proclaimed him Chief of the League of the Albanian people

Politicians and diplomats

 Ramiz Alia (1925-2011)
 Taulant Balla (born 1977)
 Sali Berisha (born 1944)
 Enver Hoxha (1908-1985)
 Besiana Kadare (born 1973)
 Ravesa Lleshi (born 1976)
 Ilir Meta (born 1969)
 Fatos Nano (born 1952)
 Agim Nesho (born 1956)
 Ismail Qemali (1844-1919)
 Edi Rama (born 1964)
 Ibrahim Rugova (1944-2006)
 Mehmet Shehu (1913-1981)
 Hashim Thaçi (born 1968)
 Esad Toptani (died 1920)
 Ahmet Zogu (1895-1961)

Visual arts

Multimedia artists
 Ilia Xhokaxhi (1948–2007)  scenographer
 Saimir Strati (born 1966)  multi-media artist, achieved six Guinness World Records
 Anri Sala (born 1974) – contemporary artist
 Burim Myftiu (born 1961) – contemporary photographer

Architects

 Andrea Alessi (1425–1505) – architect, painter and sculptor
 Sedefkar Mehmed Agha (1540–1617) – chief architect of the Sultan Ahmed Mosque.
 Architect Kasemi (1570–1659)  master of Ottoman classical architecture
 Carl Ritter von Ghega (1802–1860) – engineer and designer of railways
 Qemal Butka (1907–1997)  architect, painter, politician and postage stamps engraver
 Enver Faja (1992–1996)  architect and diplomat
 Valentina Pistoli (1928–1993)  architect

Painters

Cartoonists and illustrators 
 Ali Dino (1889–1938)  cartoonist
 Shyqri Nimani (born 1941)  graphic designer
 Agim Sulaj (born 1960)  illustrator and cartoonist

Sculptors 

 Dhimitër Çani (1904–1990)
 Agim Çavdarbasha (1944–1999)
 Sadik Kaceli (1914–2000)
 Kristina Koljaka (1916–2005)
 Genc Mulliqi (born 1966)
 Vasiliev Nini (born 1954)
 Janaq Paço (1914–1991)
 Odhise Paskali (1903–1985)
 Ardian Pepa (born 1977)
 Agim Rada (born 1953)
 Kristaq Rama (1932–1998)
 Murad Toptani (1867–1918)
 Sislej Xhafa (born 1970)
 Helidon Xhixha (born 1970)

Photographers 

 Fadil Berisha (born 1973)  official photographer for Miss Universe, Miss USA and Rolex
 Emin Kadi fashion photographer, journalist, art director and magazine publisher
 Gegë Marubi (1907–1984)  photographer
 Kel Marubi (1870–1940)  photographer
 Gjon Mili (1904–1984)  photographer known for his work published in Life Magazine
 Burim Myftiu (born 1961)  photographer
 Kristo Sulidhi (1858–1938)  photographer and writer
 George Tames (1919–1994) photographer for The New York Times
 Mimoza Veliu (born 1979)  photographer

Performing arts

Actors and actresses

Comedians and satirists 
 Spiro Çomora (1918–1973)
 Besim Dina (born 1971)
 Zyrafete Gashi (1955–2013)

Film and television directors

Dancers and choreographers 

 Esdalin Gorani  ballet dancer
 Tringa Hysa  ballet dancer
 Ilir Kerni  ballet dancer
 Spartak Hoxha  ballet dancer
 Kledi Kadiu  dancer on the popular talent show Amici di Maria De Filippi; starred in Passa a Due in 2005
 Altin Kaftira  ballet dancer
 Eno Peçi  ballet dancer
 Enkel Zhuti  ballet dancer
 Tony Dovolani (born 1973)  Albanian-American professional ballroom dancer, instructor and judge; known for his involvement in the American version of Dancing with the Stars; appeared in Shall We Dance?; spent time coaching actress Jennifer Lopez
 Angelin Preljocaj (born 1957)  choreographer of contemporary dance
 Ferbent Shehu  dancer and choreographer

Models and beauty pageant participants

Television personalities 

 Blendi Fevziu (born 1969) – television host
 Ardit Gjebrea (born 1963) – producer, television host, singer-songwriter
 Baton Haxhiu (born 1967) – journalist, television host
 Claudia Conserva (born 1974) Chilean actress, model and television presenter; of Italian-Albanian (Arbëreshë) descent
 Benet Kaci (born 1978) Kosovan television personality; from Kosovo
 Florina Kaja (born 1982) American reality-television participant, singer and actress
 Drita D'Avanzo – reality TV star on the VH1 series Mob Wives

Music

Composers

Pianists 
 Ilir Bajri (born 1969)
 Mariela Cingo (born 1978)
 Lola Gjoka(1910–1985)
 Paul Leka (1943–2011)

Violinists 
 Shkëlzen Doli (born 1971)

Guitarists 
 Dren Abazi (born 1985)
 Petrit Çeku (born 1985)
 Faton Macula
 Bledar Sejko (born 1972)

Singers

Tenors and sopranos

Sports

Football players 

 Ansi Agolli (born 1982)
 Kosovare Asllani (born 1989)
 Fatmire Bajramaj (born 1988)
 Valon Behrami (born 1985)
 Besart Berisha (born 1985)
 Erjon Bogdani (born 1977)
 Loro Boriçi (1922–1984)
 Lorik Cana (born 1983)
 Sulejman Demollari (born 1964)
 Blerim Džemaili (born 1986)
 Elseid Hysaj (born 1994)
 Andi Lila (born 1986)
 Cyme Lulaj (born 1989
 Admir Mehmedi (born 1991)
 Perlat Musta (born 1958)
 Shkodran Mustafi (born 1992)
 Panajot Pano (1939–2010)
 Altin Rraklli (born 1970)
 Armando Sadiku (born 1991)
 Hamdi Salihi (born 1984)
 Artim Shaqiri (born 1973)
 Xherdan Shaqiri (born 1991)
 Ervin Skela (born 1976)
 Thomas Strakosha (born 1995)
 Igli Tare (born 1973)
 Rudi Vata (born 1969)
 Qemal Vogli (1929–2004)
 Granit Xhaka (born 1992)
 Taulant Xhaka

Martial artists 
 Enver Idrizi Karate World Champion
 Majlinda Kelmendi Judo World and Olympic Champion (2017)
 Xhavit Bajrami boxer and kickboxer
 Elis Guri wrestler
 Besim Kabashi kickboxer
 Majlinda Kelmendi judoka
 Luan Krasniqi boxer
 Ilir Latifi MMA fighter
 Azem Maksutaj kickboxer
 Sahit Prizreni wrestler
 Kreshnik Qato boxer
 Shaban Sejdiu wrestler
 Nuri Seferi boxer
 Naim Terbunja boxer
 Shaban Tërstena wrestler
 Valdrin Vatnikaj kickboxer
 Gzim Selmani  MMA fighter and pro wrestler

Other sports 
 Ermal Kuqo (born 1980) basketball player for the Turkish team Anadolu Efes
 Aldo Zadrima (born 1948) former national chess champion
 Erjon Tola (born 1986) Olympic skier
 Frank Leskaj (born 1971) – Olympic swimmer
 Donald Suxho (born 1976) – US Olympic team volleyball player
 Adem Yze (born 1977) – Australian rules footballer
 Tie Domi (born 1969) – ice hockey player
 Molly Qerim (born 1984) sports anchor and moderator for ESPN's First Take.

Ottoman era Albanians

Others

 Joseph Ardizzone (born 1884, vanished 1931)  organized crime boss
 Joseph J. DioGuardi (born 1940) American certified public accountant and a Republican politician; his family traces its roots to the Arbëreshë people
 Kara DioGuardi (born 1970) American contemporanean composer of Albanian descent
 Donald Lambro (born 1940) American journalist; chief political correspondent of The Washington Times; columnist nationally syndicated by United Feature Syndicate
 Laura Mersini-Houghton theoretical physicist-cosmologist; professor at the University of North Carolina at Chapel Hill
 Martin Shkreli (born 1983)  pharma executive and convicted felon

See also

Native communities 
 Arbanasi
 Arbëreshë people
 Arvanites
 Cham Albanians
 Albanians in Kosovo
 Albanians in Montenegro
 Albanians in North Macedonia

References